The Shadow ministry of David Speirs is the Liberal Party opposition since April 2022, opposing the Malinauskas government of the Labor Party in the Parliament of South Australia. It is led by David Speirs following his election as party leader and leader of the opposition on 19 April 2022. The deputy leader of the shadow ministry is John Gardner.

The shadow ministry succeeded the Marshall ministry as the Liberal Party frontbench and the Malinauskas shadow ministry as the South Australian shadow cabinet.

Shadow cabinet 
The current Speirs shadow ministry was announced on 21 April 2022. The shadow ministry is made up of 15 members of the Liberal Party. Ministers from the previous Marshall ministry David Basham, David Pisoni and Stephen Wade opted to remain as backbenchers. Former deputy premier Vickie Chapman also opted not to return to frontbench after announcing her retirement from politics earlier in the week. There were a number of new additions to the Liberal Party frontbench, including Ashton Hurn and Penny Pratt who were newly elected at the election and immediately elevated to the frontbench.

Shadow Parliamentary Secretaries 
 Nick McBride , Shadow Parliamentary Secretary for Regional Engagement
 Laura Curran , Shadow Parliamentary Secretary to the Shadow Attorney-General Responsible for Child Protection and the Prevention of Family and Domestic Violence
 Dennis Hood , Shadow Cabinet Secretary

See also
2022 South Australian state election 
Malinauskas ministry

References

South Australia-related lists